Indian Prime Minister Indira Gandhi was assassinated at 9:30 a.m. on 31 October 1984 at her residence in Safdarjung Road, New Delhi. She was killed by her bodyguards Satwant Singh and Beant Singh in the aftermath of Operation Blue Star, an Indian military action carried out between 1 and 8 June 1984 ordered by Indira Gandhi to remove Jarnail Singh Bhindranwale and his followers from the Golden Temple of Harmandir Sahib in Amritsar, Punjab. The collateral damage included the death of many pilgrims, as well as damage to the Akal Takht.  The military action on the sacred temple was criticized both inside and outside India.

Operation Blue Star
Operation Blue Star was a large Indian military operation carried out between 1 and 8 June 1984, ordered by Indira Gandhi to remove leader Jarnail Singh Bhindranwale and his militant Sikh followers from the buildings of the Harmandir Sahib complex in Amritsar, Punjab. The Indian army suffered around 83 casualties with 700 injuries, and 450–500 Sikh rebels were killed during the operation. The handling of the operation, damage to the holy shrine, and loss of military and civilian life on both sides led to widespread criticism of the Indian government.

The perceived threat to Gandhi's life increased after the operation. Accordingly, Sikhs were removed from her personal bodyguard detail by the Intelligence Bureau for fear of assassination. Gandhi thought that this would reinforce her anti-Sikh image among the public, however, and she ordered the Delhi Police to reinstate her Sikh bodyguards, including Beant Singh, who was reported to be her personal favorite.

Assassination
At about 9:20 a.m. Indian Standard Time, on 31 October 1984, Gandhi was on her way to be interviewed by British actor Peter Ustinov, who was filming a documentary for Irish television. She was accompanied by Constable Narayan Singh, personal security officer Rameshwar Dayal and Gandhi's personal secretary, R. K. Dhawan. She was walking through the garden of the Prime Minister's Residence at No. 1 Safdarjung Road in New Delhi towards the neighboring 1 Akbar Road office.

Gandhi passed a wicket gate guarded by Satwant and Beant Singh, and the two men opened fire. Beant fired three rounds into her abdomen from his .38 revolver; then Satwant fired 30 rounds from his Sterling sub-machine gun after she had fallen to the ground. Both men then threw down their weapons and Beant said, "I have done what I had to do. You do what you want to do." In the next six minutes, Border Police officers Tarsem Singh Jamwal and Ram Saran captured and killed Beant, while Satwant was arrested by Gandhi's other bodyguards and an accomplice trying to escape; he was seriously wounded. Satwant Singh was hanged in 1989 with accomplice Kehar Singh.

Salma Sultan gave the first news of the assassination of Gandhi on Doordarshan's evening news on 31 October 1984, more than ten hours after she was killed. It is alleged by the Indian government that Gandhi's secretary R. K. Dhawan overruled intelligence and security officials who had ordered the removal of policemen as a security threat, including her assassins.

Beant was one of Gandhi's favorite guards, whom she had known for ten years. Because he was a Sikh, he had been taken off her staff after Operation Blue Star; however, Gandhi had made sure that he was reinstated.  Satwant was 22 years old at the time of the assassination, and had been assigned to Gandhi's guard just five months previously.

Gandhi was taken to the All India Institute of Medical Sciences, New Delhi at 9:30 a.m. Doctors operated on her. She was declared dead at 2:20 p.m. The postmortem examination was conducted by a team of doctors headed by Tirath Das Dogra, who stated that 30 bullets had struck Gandhi from a Sterling sub-machine gun and a revolver. The assailants had fired 33 bullets at her, of which 30 had hit; 23 had passed through her body, while seven remained inside. Dogra extracted bullets to establish the identity of the weapons and to correlate each weapon with the bullets recovered by ballistic examination. The bullets were matched to the weapons at CFSL Delhi. 

The Indian government ordered a national mourning from November 1 to November 12 with flags half-masted and canceled entertainment and cultural events and offices closed for several days. Pakistan declared three days of mourning and Bulgaria declared a day of national mourning.

Funeral
Gandhi's body was taken in a gun carriage through Delhi roads on the morning of 1 November to Teen Murti Bhavan, where her father stayed and where she lay in state. She was cremated with full state honors on 3 November near Raj Ghat, a memorial to Mahatma Gandhi, at an area named Shakti Sthal. Her elder son and successor, Rajiv Gandhi, lit the pyre.

Among the foreign dignitaries who attended the state funeral were:

Aftermath
Over the next four days, 8,000 Sikhs were killed in retaliatory violence.

The Justice Thakkar Commission of Inquiry, headed by Justice Manharlal Pranlal Thakkar, set up to probe Gandhi's assassination, recommended a separate probe for the conspiracy angle behind the assassination. The Thakkar Report stated that the "needle of suspicion" pointed at R. K. Dhawan for complicity in the conspiracy.

Satwant Singh and alleged conspirator Kehar Singh were sentenced to death. Both were executed on 6 January 1989.

A Punjabi movie titled Kaum De Heere (Gems of the Community) highlighting the roles/lives of the two guards that assassinated Indira Gandhi was set to be released on 22 August 2014, but was banned by the Indian government for five years.

See also

 Punjab insurgency

References

External links
 Indira Gandhi Memorial Indira Gandhi assassination books in Tamil in two volumes by Mrs. Z.Y. Himsagar and S. Padmavathi, M.A., M.L., Notion press.com, Chennai, 2016 edition, 
 Explore the Virtual Memorial of Indira Gandhi

 
1984 anti-Sikh riots
1984 murders in India
October 1984 events in Asia
Female murder victims
1980s in Delhi
Assassinations in India
Assassination
Assassination
Assassinated heads of government
Deaths by person in India
1984 in India
State funerals in India
Funerals by person
Murder in Delhi